Nebritus is a genus of stiletto flies in the family Therevidae. There are at least three described species in Nebritus.

Species
These three species belong to the genus Nebritus:
 Nebritus pellucidus Coquillett, 1894 i c g b
 Nebritus powelli Webb & Irwin, 1991 c g b
 Nebritus tanneri (Hardy, 1938) i c g b
Data sources: i = ITIS, c = Catalogue of Life, g = GBIF, b = Bugguide.net

References

Further reading

 

Therevidae
Articles created by Qbugbot
Asiloidea genera